Cranmer Hall was a manor in Lincolnshire in the sixteenth century.

It belonged to the family of Thomas Cranmer, archbishop of Canterbury.

References

Country houses in Lincolnshire
Tudor England